Ajjanahalli may refer to:

Places 

 Ajjanahalli,Tirthahalli, a village in the Shimoga District of Karnataka State, India.
 Ajjanahalli, Arsikere, a village in Hassan, India
 Ajjanahalli, Turuvekere, a village in Tumkur, India
 Ajjanahalli, Magadi, a village in Bangalore Rural, India
 Ajjanahalli, Bangalore South, a village in Bangalore Urban, India